Wirt County Schools is the operating school district within Wirt County, West Virginia. It is governed by the Wirt County Board of Education.

Schools

High schools
Wirt County High School

Middle schools
Wirt County Middle School

Elementary schools
Wirt County Primary Center

External links
Wirt County Schools

School districts in West Virginia
Education in Wirt County, West Virginia